Walter Wolfkiel Bacon (January 20, 1880 – March 18, 1962) was an American politician and accountant from Wilmington, in New Castle County, Delaware. He was a member of the Republican Party who served three terms as Mayor of Wilmington and two terms as Governor of Delaware. He is the only mayor of a Delaware city to have been elected Governor of Delaware.

Early life and family
Bacon was born at New Castle, Delaware, the son of John G. and Margaret Foster Bacon. He began selling newspapers at age 8, graduated from New Castle High School and studied at Beacom College in Wilmington. He married Mabel H. McDaniel on November 28, 1906, and had no children. They lived at the Mayfair Apartments on North Harrison Street in Wilmington and were members of the Presbyterian Church.

Professional and political career
Bacon was an accountant with U.S. Steel in Chester, Pennsylvania and Philadelphia and then with the Repauno Corporation. Upon Repauno's acquisition by the DuPont Company, he moved to the General Motors Division in Michigan, where he was treasurer with the Buick Motor Company from 1918 until 1930. Retiring early, he returned to Wilmington and entered politics.
Beginning as a Republican Party committeeman, Bacon was elected to three terms as mayor of Wilmington, first in 1935 and again in 1937 and 1939.

Governor of Delaware

Running for Governor of Delaware in 1940, he defeated State Democratic Party Chairman Josiah Marvel Jr., the Democratic Party candidate, and became the only Republican Party candidate elected to statewide office that year. He was elected again in 1944 when he defeated Isaac J. MacCollum, the Democratic Party candidate.

Bacon's terms as governor were marked primarily by the events of World War II and its aftermath. Thirty-three thousand Delaware citizens served in the Armed Forces in that war, and nearly 800 died. Two were awarded the Medal of Honor: Sergeant William L. Nelson of Middletown, and Sergeant James P. Connor of Wilmington. Air bases at New Castle and Dover were taken over by the U.S. Army and became major points of re-entry for returning soldiers when the war was over. Fort du Pont at Delaware City and Fort Miles at Cape Henlopen became major military installations protecting the shipping routes into the Delaware River. U-boats constantly menaced the coast from the near Atlantic, and because gas and other consumer products were mostly transported by ship, the many sinkings caused them to become very scarce. Two things not lacking were vegetables and broiler chickens. They became known as "Victory gardens," producing vegetables grew all over Delaware, and the Sussex County chicken business thrived. In fact, federal price controls created such a black market in broilers that led the army to eventually seal off the Delmarva peninsula and seize the chickens to assure an adequate supply to the military.

Through all this, Bacon steadily administered the state government. He was reputed to have been the first governor to work regular 8:30-to-5:00 hours. He managed a budget of about $13 million and nothing made him prouder than the doubling of the state's cash balance during his tenure. Social changes increasingly challenged the old fashioned "blue laws." When the General Assembly demonstrated reluctance to revise them, the State Attorney General, James R. Morford, ordered some 500 people across the state arrested for various Sabbath offenses. After the arrestees' names appeared in local newspapers, the laws began to change.

Death and legacy
Bacon died at Wilmington and is buried in the Old Drawyer's Presbyterian Churchyard at Odessa, Delaware.

Bacon has been described "as a simple man with simple tastes. He didn't drink, liked baseball, saw every Shirley Temple movie that came to town, pinched pennies, and perhaps was the right man for the right time when he was governor."  After the war, the U.S. Government facilities at Fort du Pont, near Delaware City, were deeded to the state and made into a state health care facility. They were named in his honor and became the Governor Bacon Health Center.

Almanac
Elections are held the first Tuesday after November 1. The governor takes office the third Tuesday of January, and has a four-year term.

Notes

References

Images
Hall of Governors Portrait Gallery; Portrait courtesy of Historical and Cultural Affairs, Dover

External links
Biographical Directory of the Governors of the United States 
Delaware's Governors 

The Political Graveyard

Places with more information
Delaware Historical Society; website; 505 North Market Street, Wilmington, Delaware 19801; (302) 655-7161
University of Delaware; Library website; 181 South College Avenue, Newark, Delaware 19717; (302) 831-2965

1880 births
1962 deaths
American Presbyterians
People from Wilmington, Delaware
Goldey–Beacom College alumni
Businesspeople from Delaware
Mayors of Wilmington, Delaware
Republican Party governors of Delaware
Burials in New Castle County, Delaware
20th-century American politicians
People from New Castle, Delaware
20th-century American businesspeople